The Harmsworth Self-Educator was a British educational magazine series "published in forty eight issues between 1905 and 1907" at the instigation of newspaper owner Alfred Harmsworth and edited by Arthur Mee. The purpose of The Self-Educator was to provide access to education for anyone who wanted to learn applied knowledge and choose a profession. A notable alumnus was Basil Brown, the self-taught astronomer and early excavator of Sutton Hoo.

See also 
 Alfred Harmsworth
 Arthur Mee
 Basil Brown

References

External links
 Harmsworth Self-Educator, Vol. 1

Magazines established in 1905
Magazines disestablished in 1907
Defunct magazines published in the United Kingdom
Education magazines
1905 establishments in the United Kingdom